The men's 20 kilometres walk competition at the 2006 Asian Games in Doha, Qatar was held on 7 December 2006 at the Marathon Street Circuit in Doha Corniche.

Schedule
All times are Arabia Standard Time (UTC+03:00)

Records

Results 
Legend
DNS — Did not start

References 

Athletics at the 2006 Asian Games
2006